The economy of Liberia is extremely underdeveloped, with only $3.222 billion by gross domestic product as of 2019, largely due to the First (1989–1996) and Second Liberian Civil War (1999–2003). Liberia itself is one of the poorest and least developed countries in the world, according to the United Nations.

Until 1979, Liberia's economy was among the more developed and fastest-growing in Sub-Saharan Africa, but after the 1980 coup d'état, it declined, and the civil war destroyed much of Liberia's economy and infrastructure, especially the infrastructure in and around the nation's capital, Monrovia. The war also caused a brain drain and the loss of capital, as the civil war involved overthrowing the Americo-Liberian minority that ruled the country. Some have returned since 1997, but many have not.

Liberia is richly endowed with water, mineral resources, forests, and a climate favorable to agriculture, but poor in human capital, infrastructure, and stability. Liberia has a fairly typical profile for Sub-Saharan African economies. The majority of the population is reliant on subsistence agriculture, while exports are dominated by raw commodities such as rubber and iron ore. Local manufacturing, such as it exists, is mainly foreign-owned.

The democratically elected government, installed in August 1997, inherited massive international debts and currently relies on revenues from its maritime registry to provide the bulk of its foreign exchange earnings. The restoration of the infrastructure and the raising of incomes in this ravaged economy depend on the implementation of sound macro- and microeconomic policies of the new government, including the encouragement of foreign investment.

Economic history 

Much of independent Liberia's economic history is subject to limited archival documentation, making it hard for economic historians to make comprehensive assessments about the nature of Liberia's economy over time. The Liberian government only began producing GDP per capita data in 1964. 

A 2022 study by LSE economic historian Leigh A. Gardner assessed that Liberian GDP per capita was $430 in 1945, which was just above subsistence and approximately half of Japan's GDP per capita at the time. It rose to approximately $500 by the time of independence, but the economy subsequently stagnated until the 1930s when a period of rapid economic growth began. Whereas Liberia had been poorer than Ghana during the 19th and early 20th centuries, it caught up with Ghana in 1950 and subsequently diverged considerably, becoming almost twice as wealthy as Ghana by 1970. Throughout the 1970s, the Liberian economy stagnated.

In 1926, the Liberian government gave the Firestone Tire company the right to lease up to 1 million acres of land for 99 years at a cost of 6 cents per acre. Firestone developed an inordinate sway over the Liberian government, effectively acquiring control over its finances in the subsequent period. The company was an important source of foreign investment into Liberia during this period. Firestone then set about establishing rubber tree plantations of the non-native South American rubber tree, Hevea brasiliensis in the country. By the 1950s, the company was Liberia's largest private employer and also its largest exporter. Vincent Browne wrote in 1955 that rubber accounted for more than $45,000,000 of Liberia's approximately $55,000,000 worth of exports. Liberia became one of the largest rubber exporters in the world in the post-World War II period. Today, Firestone's rubber plantation in Liberia is the world's largest contiguous rubber plantation, operated by the Firestone (now Bridgestone) subsidiary, the Firestone Natural Rubber Company.

In the 1940s, Liberia become one of the largest recipients of American aid. US aid to Liberia began with the Lend-Lease program of 1942. The aid per capita received by Liberia was comparable to that obtained by countries such as Korea and Marshall Aid recipients like the United Kingdom. Economic historian George Dalton estimated in 1965 that Liberia received more aid per capita from the United States than any other African country.

In the post-WWII period, Liberia tried to become a destination for offshore services, as the country loosened laws related to ship registration, corporation, and taxes. The Liberian shipping registry was highly successful as Liberia had by the 1960s become the largest ship registry in the world in terms of tonnage.

The Liberian economy had relied heavily on the mining of iron ore prior to the civil war. Liberia was a major exporter of iron ore on the world market. By the 1970s, iron mining accounted for more than half of Liberia's export earnings. Since the coup d'état of 1980, the country's economic growth rate has slowed down because of a decline in the demand for iron ore on the world market and political upheavals in Liberia.

Upon the end of the war in 2003, GDP growth began to accelerate again, reaching a peak of 9.4% in 2007. The global financial crisis slowed GDP growth to 4.6% in 2009, though a strengthening agricultural sector led by rubber and timber exports increased growth to 5.1% in 2010 and an expected 7.3% in 2011, making the economy one of the 20 fastest growing in the world.

In March 2010, Bob Johnson, founder of BET, funded the first hotel constructed in Liberia in 20 years. The  luxury resort was built in the Paynesville section of Monrovia.

Liberia's external debt was estimated in 2006 at approximately $4.5 billion, 800% of GDP. As a result of bilateral, multilateral and commercial debt relief from 2007 to 2010, the country's external debt fell to $222.9 million by 2011.

Economic sectors 

Liberia's business sector is largely controlled by foreigners mainly of Levantine (primarily Lebanese) and Indian descent. There also are limited numbers of Chinese engaged in agriculture. The largest timber concession, Oriental Timber Corporation (OTC), is Indonesian owned. There also are significant numbers of West Africais engaged in cross-border trade.  Legal monopolies are possible; for example, Cemenco holds a monopoly on cement production.

Unlike almost all other countries in the world, Liberia has not adopted the metric system as its primary system of measurement.

Forestry 
Timber and rubber are Liberia's main export items since the end of the war. Liberia earns more than $100 million and more than $70 million annually from timber and rubber exports, respectively.

Mining and resources 

Alluvial diamond and gold mining activities also account for some economic activity. In recent years (2005 - 2012), foreign investment from ArcelorMittal Steel, BHP Biliton, and China Union is aiding the revitalization of the iron-ore mining sector.

Liberia has begun exploration for offshore oil; unproven oil reserves may be in excess of one billion barrels. The government divided its offshore waters into 17 blocks and began auctioning off exploration licenses for the blocks in 2004, with further auctions in 2007 and 2009. An additional 13 ultra-deep offshore blocks were demarcated in 2011 and planned for auction. Among the companies to have won licenses are Repsol YPF, Chevron Corporation, and Woodside Petroleum.

Shipping flag of convenience 
Liberia maintains an open maritime registry, meaning that owners of ships can register their vessels as Liberian with relatively few restrictions. This has meant that Liberian ship registration is usually understood as the employment of a flag of convenience. Liberia has the second-largest maritime registry in the world behind Panama, with 4,300 vessels registered under its flag accounting for 12% of ships worldwide. This includes 35% of the world's tanker fleet. Liberia earned more than $18 million from its maritime program in 2000.

Foreign aid 
Liberia has relied heavily on vast amounts of foreign assistance, particularly from the United States, Sweden, Britain, France, Italy, Germany, the People's Republic of China, and Romania. But because of the Liberian Government's perceived disregard for human rights, foreign assistance to Liberia has declined drastically.

The Republic of China (Taiwan) and Libya are currently the largest donors of direct financial aid to the Liberian Government. Significant amounts of aid continue to come in from Western countries through international aid agencies and non-governmental organizations, avoiding direct aid to the government.

Communications 

Communications in Liberia is the press, radio, television, fixed and mobile telephones, and the Internet. There are six major newspapers in Liberia, and 45% of the population has a mobile phone service. Also, the radio stations in Liberia are abundant to the extent that there are over 70 radio stations in the entire country (Liberia). As for Montserrado County, there exist about 30 radio stations.

Even as it struggles with economic and political constraints, Liberia's media environment is expanding. The number of registered newspapers and radio stations (many of them community stations) is on the rise despite limited market potential. And politically critical content and investigative pieces do get published or broadcast.

Energy 

Formal electricity services are solely provided by the state-owned Liberia Electricity Corporation, which operates a small grid almost exclusively in the Greater Monrovia District. The vast majority of electric energy services is provided by small privately owned generators. At $0.54 per kWh, the electricity tariff in Liberia is among the highest in the world. Total installed capacity in 2013 was 20 MW, a sharp decline from a peak of 191 MW in 1989.

International economic networks 

Liberia is a member of the Economic Community of West African States (ECOWAS). With Guinea and Sierra Leone, it formed the Mano River Union (MRU) for development and the promotion of regional economic integration. The MRU became all but defunct because of the Liberian civil war which spilled over into neighboring Sierra Leone and Guinea.

See also 
 Central Bank of Liberia
 Transport in Liberia
 Tourism in Liberia
 Firestone Natural Rubber Company
 United Nations Economic Commission for Africa

References

External links
 68% of Liberians live in poverty census reveals
 
 Mineral resources of Liberia
 Liberia latest trade data on ITC Trade Map
 Liberia profile - World Bank

 
Liberia